Earthrise is a photograph of Earth and some of the Moon's surface that was taken from lunar orbit by astronaut William Anders on December 24, 1968, during the Apollo 8 mission. Nature photographer Galen Rowell described it as "the most influential environmental photograph ever taken".

Anders's color image had been preceded by a crude black-and-white 1966 raster image taken by the Lunar Orbiter 1 robotic probe, the first American spacecraft to orbit the Moon.

Details 

Earthrise was taken by astronaut William Anders during the Apollo 8 mission, the first crewed voyage to orbit the Moon. Before Anders found a suitable 70 mm color film, mission commander Frank Borman took a black-and-white photograph of the scene, with the Earth's terminator touching the horizon. The land mass position and cloud patterns in this image are the same as those of the color photograph entitled Earthrise.

The photograph was taken from lunar orbit on December 24, 1968, 15:40 UTC, with a highly modified Hasselblad 500 EL with an electric drive. The camera had a simple sighting ring rather than the standard reflex viewfinder and was loaded with a 70 mm film magazine containing custom Ektachrome film developed by Kodak. Immediately prior, Anders had been photographing the lunar surface with a 250 mm lens; the lens was subsequently used for the Earthrise images.

There were many images taken at that point. The mission audio tape establishes several photographs were taken, on Borman's orders, with the enthusiastic concurrence of Jim Lovell and Anders. Anders took the first color shot, then Lovell who notes the setting (1/250th of a second at ), followed by Anders with another very similar shot (AS08-14-2384).

A black and white reproduction of Borman's image appeared in his 1988 autobiography, captioned, "One of the most famous pictures in photographic history – taken after I grabbed the camera away from Bill Anders". Borman noted that this was the image "the Postal Service used on a stamp, and few photographs have been more frequently reproduced". The photograph reproduced is not the same image as the Anders photograph; aside from the orientation, the cloud patterns differ. Borman later recanted this story and agreed that the black and white shot was also taken by Anders, based on evidence presented by transcript and a video produced by NASA Goddard Space Flight Center Scientific Visualization Studio employee, Ernie Wright.  

After Apollo 8's momentous return, NASA technicians – not able to wait for normal film processing – drove four hours from Houston to Corpus Christi Texas to the family-owned R & R Photo Studio & Color Labs (later known as R & R PhotoTechnics) which at that time was the first and only place in South Texas with color photo processing equipment.  More importantly, R&R featured the rare 4-hour Ektachrome slide processing capability for the professional 220-size film used by the astronauts' Hasselblad, making R&R a convenient same-day trip for NASA's critical need.

There, the owner Raul Rodriguez took the precious film which had travelled  to the far side of the moon and back.  He personally developed the slides and copied them to regular 220 negatives, which he then also had to develop.  Then he exposed and printed the requested photos in quick 8" x 10" glossy size, one of which would eventually be known as Earthrise.  Raul then returned the slides, negatives & photos to the appreciative NASA technicians to rush back to Houston.

For the Earthrise slides, then later the Earthrise negatives, Raul used a German-made Merz S2A dual-rocking-drum developer.  To print the first Earthrise photo, he used an Auto-focus Chromega D4 enlarger that had modern dial-in color filters.  It sat on a motorized-drive, lightproof, 11" wide, roll-paper carrier.  The images came to life via Raul's then state-of-the-art, self-replenishing, mylar-leader, continuous-feed roll-photo paper processor produced by the Nord photo company then based in Minneapolis, Minnesota.

The stamp issue reproduces the cloud, color, and crater patterns of the Anders picture. Anders is described by Borman as holding "a masters degree in nuclear engineering"; Anders was thus tasked as "the scientific crew member ... also performing the photography duties that would be so important to the Apollo crew who actually landed on the Moon".

On the 50th anniversary of the Apollo 8 mission in 2018, Anders stated: "It really undercut my religious beliefs. The idea that things rotate around the pope and up there is a big supercomputer wondering whether Billy was a good boy yesterday? It doesn't make any sense. I became a big buddy of [atheist scientist] Richard Dawkins."

Geometry 
The original image was rotated 95 degrees clockwise to produce the published Earthrise orientation to better convey the sense of the Earth rising over the moonscape. The published photograph shows Earth rotated clockwise approximately 135° from the typical north–south-Pole-oriented perspective, with south to the left.

Legacy 

In Lifes 2003 book 100 Photographs that Changed the World, wilderness photographer Galen Rowell called Earthrise "the most influential environmental photograph ever taken". Another author called its appearance the beginning of the environmental movement. Fifty years to the day after taking the photo, William Anders observed, "We set out to explore the moon and instead discovered the Earth."

In October 2018, two of the craters seen in the photo were named Anders' Earthrise and 8 Homeward by the Working Group for Planetary System Nomenclature (WGPSN) of the International Astronomical Union. The craters had previously been designated only with letters.

Joni Mitchell sings on her 1976 song "Refuge of the Roads": "In a highway service station / Over the month of June / Was a photograph of the Earth / Taken coming back from the Moon / And you couldn't see a city / On that marbled bowling ball / Or a forest or a highway / Or me here least of all …"

Stamp 

In 1969, the U.S. Postal Service issued a stamp (Scott# 1371) commemorating the Apollo 8 flight around the Moon. The stamp featured a detail (in color) of the Earthrise photograph, and the words, "In the beginning God...", recalling the Apollo 8 Genesis reading.

2013 simulation 
In 2013, in commemoration of the 45th anniversary of the Apollo 8 mission, NASA issued a video about the taking of the photograph. This computer-generated visualization used data from the Lunar Reconnaissance Orbiter spacecraft, which had provided detailed images of the lunar surface that could be matched with those taken every 20 seconds by an automatic camera on Apollo 8. The resulting video, re-creating what the astronauts would have seen (rotated 90 degrees clockwise to match the perspective presented in the photograph), was synchronized with the recording of the crew's conversation as they became the first humans to witness an Earthrise. The video included explanatory narration written and read by Andrew Chaikin. Chaikin writes that all the photographs of the rising Earth on Apollo 8's fourth orbit were taken by Anders.

Potential earthrises as seen from the Moon's surface 
The Earth "rose" because the spacecraft was traveling over the Moon's surface.  An earthrise that might be witnessed from the surface of the Moon would be quite unlike moonrises on Earth. Because the Moon is tidally locked with the Earth, one side of the Moon always faces toward Earth. Interpretation of this fact would lead one to believe that the Earth's position is fixed on the lunar sky and no earthrises can occur; however, the Moon librates slightly, which causes the Earth to draw a Lissajous figure on the sky. This figure fits inside a rectangle 15°48' wide and 13°20' high (in angular dimensions), while the angular diameter of the Earth as seen from Moon is only about 2°. This means that earthrises are visible near the edge of the Earth-observable surface of the Moon (about 20% of the surface). Since a full libration cycle takes about 27 days, earthrises are very slow, and it takes about 48 hours for Earth to clear its diameter. During the course of the month-long lunar orbit, an observer would additionally witness a succession of "Earth phases", much like the lunar phases seen from Earth. That is what accounts for the half-illuminated globe, the ashen glow, seen in the photograph.

See also 

 The Blue Marble
 First images of Earth from space
 Earth phase
 Pale Blue Dot
 List of photographs considered the most important

References

External links 

 Earthrise: The 45th Anniversary (NASA Goddard, YouTube channel)
 Earthrise: The 45th Anniversary – NASA Goddard webpage with various reconstruction videos
 Lunar Reconnaissance Orbiter, reconstruction video of the Earthrise photograph

1968 in art
1968 in spaceflight
1968 in the environment
1968 photographs
Apollo 8
Apollo program
Articles containing video clips
Color photographs
History of environmentalism
Photographs of Earth from outer space
Works about the Moon
William Anders